Uranothauma vansomereni, the pale heart, is a butterfly in the family Lycaenidae. It is found in Kenya, Tanzania (Madibira and Ilenga), the Democratic Republic of the Congo (from the south-eastern part of the country to Shaba), Malawi, Zambia, Mozambique and eastern Zimbabwe. The habitat consists of savanna.

Both sexes mud-puddle. There seem to be two generations per year, with adults on wing in spring and autumn.

The larvae feed on Albizia species.

References

Butterflies described in 1951
Uranothauma